This is a list of resolutions adopted by the United Nations General Assembly during its 2nd session held in 1947-1948.

References

 http://research.un.org/en/docs/ga/quick/regular/2

United Nations General Assembly resolutions